Loma Linda Academy (LLA) is a Seventh-day Adventist K-12 college preparatory coeducational school in Loma Linda, California, United States. It is the largest Seventh-day Adventist K-12 school in the United States, with 1289 students . The city of Loma Linda "is home to one of the largest concentrations of Seventh-day Adventists in the world"; LLA is one of a number of Adventist institutions located in the town, including Loma Linda University and Loma Linda University Church.

LLA comprises four separate, semi-autonomous schools: Loma Linda Academy Children's Center, a preschool, Loma Linda Elementary, an elementary school; Loma Linda Academy Junior High, a junior high school; and Loma Linda Academy, a high school. In addition to an academy-wide head of schools, each school has its own principal. The current head of schools is Iveth Valenzuela.

History

The school was founded on January 13, 1906, with six students in a pitched tent on Sanitarium Hill, Loma Linda. It was previously named Loma Linda Union Academy. In 1921, as the school continued to grow, LLA had its first graduated class. In the 1930s, a building, now known as Franz Hall, was constructed in an effort to continue as a thriving school. 

In 1969, San Timoteo Creek, which forms the northern boundary of the school's property, flooded the entire school and parts of the city, causing hundreds of thousands of dollars in damage to the school.

Academic structure

Children's Center
Loma Linda Academy Children's Center provides care for children ages 3 months through 5 years. The current director is Mariana Mitroi.

Elementary
Loma Linda Elementary includes transitional kindergarten through sixth grade. The current principal is Ronald Trautwein.

Junior high
Loma Linda Academy Junior High comprises seventh and eighth grades. The current principal is Amy Cornwall.

High school
Loma Linda Academy includes ninth through twelfth grades. The current principal is Hans Figueroa. The high school has more than 450 students.

Accreditation 
Loma Linda Academy is accredited by the Accrediting Commission for Schools, Western Association of Schools and Colleges, and the Adventist Accrediting Association.

Campus
The Loma Linda Academy campus is located in the north western portion of the city of Loma Linda. It is bordered on the east by Anderson St. and lies between San Timoteo Creek on the north and the Union Pacific tracks on the south. The campus is split by Academy St. which separates the elementary (LLE) on the south from the junior high, high school, and their athletic fields on the north side. LLA does not provide busing for students, but the school can be reached by public transit via Omnitrans fixed-route service and sbX. There is also a Class I path planned for the banks of San Timoteo Creek.

Children's Center
The Loma Linda Children's Center campus is a little more centrally located at a location approximately a mile away from the main LLA campus on Shepardson St. It is directly adjacent the Drayson Center and near the Loma Linda VA hospital.

Student life
The academy publishes a student newspaper, The Mirror, as well as an annual yearbook, Lomasphere. LLA students are able to participate in a number of activities and social events throughout the school year. In elementary, sixth grade students are offered the opportunity to participate in rock climbing field trips during the winter months.
High school students have a number of events on the calendar which are meant to provide time for spiritual development and social interaction. These events include the handshake, school picnic, beach vespers, Bible retreats at Pines Springs Ranch, Camp Cedar Falls, and other Adventist academies, the Christmas, Junior/Senior, and Valentine's banquets (social event in place of a prom), track & field day, and others throughout the school year.

Student Government
LLA high school students elected class officers each year to represent their individual classes in various events throughout there year as well as senators to serve in the student Senate for the entire high school. Elections are held in the fall except for the graduating senior class, whose elections are held in the spring of their junior year to provide officers enough time to plan events for seniors. The class officers for senior year are also the class officers for the class after graduation and are expected to plan reunions and keep everyone apprised of events that are of interest to alumni.

Athletics
The LLA athletics department is dedicated to helping students in "developing a Christ-like character through teamwork, sportsmanship, integrity, honesty, and respect." The school mascot is the roadrunner and the Roadrunners compete in the California Interscholastic Federation (CIF). LLA's varsity teams include cross-country, flag football, volleyball, basketball, soccer, golf, baseball, softball, swimming, and badminton. Junior varsity teams consist of volleyball, basketball, soccer, baseball, badminton, and flag football.

Alumni
LLA has an alumni association and hosts an annual alumni weekend, generally in the spring. There are also alumni-varsity games at some of the tournaments which are hosted throughout the year. Each class provides a class gift to the school.

See also

 List of Seventh-day Adventist secondary schools
 Seventh-day Adventist education

References

External links

Private elementary schools in California
Private middle schools in California
Preparatory schools in California
Educational institutions established in 1906
High schools in San Bernardino County, California
Adventist secondary schools in the United States
Loma Linda, California
Schools accredited by the Western Association of Schools and Colleges
Private high schools in California
1906 establishments in California
Private K-12 schools in California
Education in San Bernardino County, California
Schools in San Bernardino County, California